

Sovereign states

A
 Adal – Adal Sultanate
 Ahom – Ahom Kingdom
Aïr – Terene Sultanate of Aïr
Airgíalla
 Ajuran – Ajuran Sultanate
 Ak Koyunlu
 Alodia – Kingdom of Alodia
Amber – Kingdom of Amber
 Ancona – Republic of Ancona
 Andorra – Principality of Andorra
 Aragon – Crown of Aragon
Ava – Kingdom of Ava
 Ayutthaya – Kingdom of Ayutthaya
 Aztec – Aztec Empire

B
Bahmani – Bahmani Sultanate
Bajhang – Kingdom of Bajhang
Bamum – Kingdom of Bamum
Banggai – Kingdom of Banggai
Banu Sulaym
Bastar – Bastar State
 Béarn – Principality of Béarn
Bengal – Sultanate of Bengal
Benin – Kingdom of Benin
Bone – Bone Sultanate
Bonoman
Borgu Kingdoms
 Bornu – Bornu Empire
 Bosnia – Kingdom of Bosnia
 Brittany – Duchy of Brittany
 Brunei – Bruneian Empire
Bundi – Bundi State
 Burgundy – Duchy of Burgundy
Butua – Kingdom of Butua
 Butuan – Rajahnate of Butuan

C
Caboloan
 Cambodia – Kingdom of Cambodia
 Carbery – Barony of Carbery
 Castile – Crown of Castile
Cebu
Chamba – Chamba State
Champa – Kingdom of Champa
Chandrapur
Chaudand
Chimor – Kingdom of Chimor
China – Empire of the Great Ming
Chudasama – Chudasama dynasty
 Chutiya – Chutiya Kingdom
 Clandeboye
Clanricarde
 Cospaia – Republic of Cospaia
 Crimea – Crimean Khanate
Cutch – Cutch State
 Cyprus – Kingdom of Cyprus

D
Đại Việt – Kingdom of Đại Việt
Damot – Kingdom of Damot
Daya
 Delhi – Delhi Sultanate
 Desmond – Kingdom of Desmond
Dhor – Kingdom of Dhor
Didoya
Dizak – Principality of Dizak
Dulkadiroğulları – Beylik of Dulkadir
Durdzuketia

E
 East Breifne – Kingdom of East Breifne
 England – Kingdom of England
 Epirus – Despotate of Epirus
Ethiopia – Ethiopian Empire

F
 Fermanagh
 Ferrara – Duchy of Ferrara
 Foix – County of Foix
Four Oirat –  Alliance of the Four Oirats
 France – Kingdom of France

G
Gajapati – Gajapati Empire
Galuh – Galuh Kingdom
Garha – Garha Kingdom
Garhwal – Garhwal Kingdom
Gazikumukh – Gazikumukh Shamkhalate
 Genoa – Republic of Genoa
 Georgia – Kingdom of Georgia
 Golden Horde – Ulus of Jochi
Gowa – Sultanate of Gowa
 Granada – Emirate of Granada
Gujarat – Sultanate of Gujarat
Gulistan – Principality of Gulistan

H
Hamamshen – Principality of Hamamshen
 Hanthawaddy – Kingdom of Hanthawaddy Pegu
Hausa Kingdoms
 Holy Roman Empire
Houara
 Hungary – Kingdom of Hungary

I
Igala – Igala Kingdom
 Imereti – Kingdom of Imereti
 Inca Empire – Realm of the Four Parts
Iroquois – Iroquois Confederacy
 Iveagh
 İsfendiyaroğulları – Beylik of Isfendiyar

J
Jaffna – Kingdom of Jaffna
Jaisalmer – Kingdom of Jaisalmer
 Japan – Ashikaga Shogunate
Jaunpur – Jaunpur Sultanate
Jolof – Jolof Empire
Joseon – Kingdom of Great Joseon
Jraberd – Principality of Jraberd
Jumla – Kingdom of Jumla

K
Kabardia – Principality of Kabardia
Kachari – Kachari Kingdom
Kalahandi – Kalahandi State
 Kalmar Union
Kamata – Kamata Kingdom
 Kangleipak – Kangleipak Kingdom
Kangra – Kangra State
Kanker – Kanker State
 Kara Koyunlu
 Karaman – Emirate of Karaman
Kashmir – Shah Mir dynasty of Kashmir
 Kastrioti – Principality of Kastrioti
 Kazan – Khanate of Kazan
Khachen – Principality of Khachen
Khandesh – Khandesh Sultanate
 Kilwa – Kilwa Sultanate 
 Kongo – Kingdom of Kongo
Kumaon – Kumaon Kingdom

L
Ladakh – Namgyal dynasty of Ladakh 
Lamuri – Lamuri Kingdom
Lan Na – Lan Na Kingdom
Lan Xang – Kingdom of Lan Xang
 Lithuania – Grand Duchy of Lithuania
 Livonia – Livonian Confederation
Luwu – Kingdom of Luwu

M
 Mac William Íochtar
Madja-as – Confederation of Madja-as
Magh Luirg
 Majapahit – Majapahit Empire
Malacca – Malacca Sultanate
 Maldives – Sultanate of the Maldives
 Mali – Mali Empire
Malwa – Malwa Sultanate
 Mamluks – Mamluk Sultanate
Marwar – Kingdom of Marwar
Maya civilization
Maynila – Rajahnate of Maynila
Mewar – Kingdom of Mewar
Mewat – Khanzadas of Mewat
 Moghulistan – Eastern Chagatai Khanate
 Morocco – Sultanate of Morocco
Mossi Kingdoms
Mrauk U – Kingdom of Mrauk U
Muisca – Muisca Confederation
Mutapa – Kingdom of Mutapa

N
 Naples – Kingdom of Naples
 Navarre – Kingdom of Navarre
Nepal – Malla dynasty of Nepal
Ngoyo
 Nogai Horde
Northern Yuan
 Novgorod – Novgorod Republic
Nri – Kingdom of Nri
Nupe – Nupe Kingdom

O
 Oman – Imamate of Oman
Ossetia
 Ossory – Kingdom of Ossory
 Ottoman Empire – Sublime Ottoman State
Oyo – Oyo Empire

P
Pagaruyung – Pagaruyung Kingdom
 Pallars Sobirà – County of Pallars Sobirà
 Papal States – State of the Church
Patna – Patna State
 Poland – Kingdom of Poland
 Portugal – Kingdom of Portugal and the Algarves
 Pskov – Pskov Republic

R
 Ragusa – Republic of Ragusa
Raigama – Kingdom of Raigama
Ramazanoğulları – Emirate of Ramadan
 Rhodes – Order of Saint John
Rinpungpa
Ryukyu – Ryukyu Kingdom

S
Samudera Pasai – Samudera Pasai Sultanate
San Marino – Republic of San Marino
 Scotland – Kingdom of Scotland
 Senarica – Republic of Senarica
Shan States
Showa – Sultanate of Showa
 Sindh – Samma dynasty of Sindh
 Sri Lanka – Kingdom of Kotte
Suket – Suket State
Sunda – Sunda Kingdom

T
 Tarascan – Tarascan State
Tarki – Shamkhalate of Tarki
Ternate – Sultanate of Ternate
 Teutonic Order – State of the Teutonic Order
 Theodoro – Principality of Theodoro
 Thomond – Kingdom of Thomond
 Tibet – Phagmodrupa dynasty of Tibet
Tidore – Sultanate of Tidore
 Timurid Empire
 Tír Eoghain
 Tlaxcala – Confederacy of Tlaxcala
 Tlemcen – Zayyanid Kingdom of Tlemcen
Tondo
 Trebizond – Empire of Trebizond
 Tunis – Sultanate of Tunis
Tunjur – Tunjur Kingdom
Twipra – Twipra Kingdom
 Tyrconnell

U
Uí Díarmata
Uí Failghe – Kingdom of Uí Failghe
 Uí Maine
 Umhaill
 Urbino – Lordship of Urbino
Usfurids
Uzbek Khanate

V
Varanda – Principality of Varanda
 Venice – Republic of Venice
Vijayanagara – Vijayanagara Empire
Vijaypur

W
Wagadugu
Wajo – Wajo Kingdom
Warsangali – Warsangali Sultanate
 West Breifne – Kingdom of West Breifne
 West Connacht

Y
Yemen –  Tahirid dynasty of Yemen

Z
Zapotec civilization
 Zeta – Principality of Zeta

Holy Roman Empire
The Holy Roman Empire was a highly decentralized collection of polities.

Non-sovereign territories

States claiming sovereignty
 Couto Misto